Sanderburg (Sander's castle) is the smallest of three castles in Windhoek, Namibia. It was built between 1917 and 1919 by architect Wilhelm Sander who designed it as his own place of residence. Its architectural style combines several medieval features.

See also
 Heinitzburg
 Schwerinsburg

External links
 Sanderburg on structurae.de, with a picture of the complete castle

References

Buildings and structures in Windhoek
Castles in Namibia